David Audain (born 21 October 1956) is a Trinidadian cricketer. He played in fourteen first-class and eight List A matches for Trinidad and Tobago from 1977 to 1983.

See also
 List of Trinidadian representative cricketers

References

External links
 

1956 births
Living people
Trinidad and Tobago cricketers